Paige Decker (born March 20, 1993) is an American professional stock car racing driver from Eagle River, Wisconsin. She has raced in the NASCAR Camping World Truck Series and Xfinity Series and was a 2014 NASCAR Drive for Diversity participant.

Racing career

Decker started her racing career in snowmobiles as a 3-year-old. When Natalie was 9 years old, Chuck bought her a kart and he bought one for Paige too.

Decker raced in asphalt short tracks in Wisconsin and gradually branched out to other tracks in the Midwestern United States. She toured in the Mid-American Stock Car Series in 2010 and 2011. Then she moved up to racing in Super Late Models. She joined the TUNDRA Super Late Model Tour in 2013. Decker became the first woman and rookie to win in the series at the Golden Sands Speedway event. Decker was awarded the tour's Rookie of the Year in 2013.

NASCAR

Decker was named as a NASCAR Drive for Diversity driver in 2014. She competed in Whelen All-American Series events for Rev Racing that year at the Hickory Motor Speedway, Langley Speedway, and Motor Mile Speedway. She had been attending the University of Wisconsin-Stout (pursuing a degree in early childhood education) for two years but had to quit to race in the Southern United States for the season. She returned to college in 2015 while continuing to race super late models. Decker received a call from Mike Harmon Racing at New Smyrna Speedway during the World Series of Stock Car Racing within the Daytona Speedweeks to see if she was interested to race in one of their trucks. She attempted her first ever NASCAR Camping World Truck Series race driving the No. 74 Chevrolet for owner/driver Mike Harmon, but was one of four teams that failed to qualify. She qualified 33rd fastest, about 1/10 second behind the 32nd final spot. The first practice for the race had rained out and she had one 90 minute practice to find speed. She has NASCAR certification to run short tracks in the Truck Series only; her goal is to race in the Xfinity Series. Decker planned  another attempt at Iowa Speedway on June 19, 2015; this deal, however, did not come together. Decker qualified in the fall Martinsville race and finished 30th. Decker returned in 2016, with her sister Claire Decker, and her cousin Natalie Decker competing in the Martinsville race. Claire and Paige qualified for the race, while Natalie was sent home.

Personal life

Decker is the daughter of Allen Decker who comes from a family of snowmobile racing riders. Four Decker brothers raced snowmobiles in the 1970s; Allen Decker was a factory rider for Bombardier along with teammate Jacques Villeneuve for the 1979–80 season. The Decker family raced snowmobiles against the Danica Patrick family during the 1970s. Sue Decker, Paige's aunt, introduced Danica Patrick's parents.

Her sister Claire Decker also races for her family's Decker Racing team. They are joined on the team by their younger cousin NASCAR Drive for Diversity driver Natalie Decker. Natalie's father (and Paige's uncle) is Chuck Decker, the former owner of the Eagle River Derby Track which hosts the World Championship Snowmobile Derby.

Decker was a student at the University of Wisconsin–Stout and graduated in December 2016.

Images

Motorsports career results

NASCAR
(key) (Bold – Pole position awarded by qualifying time. Italics – Pole position earned by points standings or practice time. * – Most laps led.)

Xfinity Series

Camping World Truck Series

 Season still in progress
 Ineligible for series points

References

External links

Decker Racing Official website

University of Wisconsin–Stout alumni
1993 births
People from Eagle River, Wisconsin
Racing drivers from Wisconsin
Living people
American female racing drivers
NASCAR drivers
21st-century American women
ARCA Midwest Tour drivers